Jesus' discourse with Nicodemus is related in John 3:1–21, but not in the synoptic gospels. For fear of the Jewish authorities a ruler in Israel, Nicodemus, one of the Pharisees, comes by night to see Jesus. Jesus explains to him that to enter the Kingdom of God, he must be born again of water and of the Spirit. These words are thought to refer to the Sacrament of Baptism.

Narrative

Context
Nicodemus is thought to have been one of about 6,000 Pharisees at the time. Jesus was not well regarded by the Pharisees or Sanhedrin. Any meetings with Jesus would have jeopardized a Pharisee's position and reputation, and so this may have the reason for him coming by night.

This new birth that Jesus speaks of is thought to allude to Hosea 1:10, “Ye shall be called the sons of the living God.”

The wind is compared to the Holy Spirit in verse 8 of the discourse. This may be compared to Acts 2, when the Holy Spirit came down upon the Apostles as "a rushing mighty wind".

Nicodemus is mentioned again in John 7:50 and 19:39. The latter reference mentions the occasion in John 3 when Nicodemus met with Jesus.

Commentary

Roger Baxter, in his Meditations, reflects on moral quality of Nicodemus' timidity:
Nicodemus being a man of high character, among his fellow citizens, and afraid of the censures of the world, came during the night, for instructions to Christ. He came in this private manner, "for fear of the Jews", for his mind probably revolted at the idea of appearing among the unlettered and poor disciples of the Man-God. How many thousands have lost their immortal souls by indulging this feeling! How many at this moment indulge it! Do not imitate their example, but say with St Paul, "I am not ashamed of the Gospel". (Rom. 1:16) Confess God both confidently, and openly, for Christ says: "Whosoever shall be ashamed of Me, and of My words, of him shall the Son of man be ashamed, when He shall come in His majesty." (Luke 9:26) 

German theologian Justus Knecht highlights two doctrinal points that come from this narrative:
1. The necessity of Baptism. Only he who is born again of water and of the Holy Ghost has any part in the kingdom of God. By Baptism man becomes a member of God’s kingdom upon earth, i.e. the Church of Jesus Christ, and an heir of God’s kingdom in heaven. Thus Baptism is absolutely necessary to salvation.2. Original sin. The words of our Lord testify to the existence of original sin. They suppose that by our natural birth we have not that spiritual divine life in our soul which was given to our first parents in Paradise, and consequently that we have lost the principle of that life, sanctifying grace and all that was connected with it. We are born (spiritually) dead. This is the sin of our origin from Adam.

See also 
 Life of Jesus in the New Testament
 Ministry of Jesus
 Nicodemus
 John 3:16

References 

Gospel of John
Nicodemus